Prostasin is a protein that in humans is encoded by the PRSS8 gene.

This gene encodes a trypsinogen, which is a member of the trypsin family of serine proteases. This enzyme is highly expressed in prostate epithelia and is one of several proteolytic enzymes found in seminal fluid. The proprotein is cleaved to produce a light chain and a heavy chain which are associated by a disulfide bond. It is active on peptide linkages involving the carboxyl group of lysine or arginine.

The protein is implicated in epithelial sodium channel regulation and may help regulate a variety of tissue functions that involve a sodium channel.

High prostasin plasma levels may be associated with a higher risk for diabetes and death from cancer, especially in people with high blood sugar.

References

Further reading 

 
 
 
 
 
 
 
 
 
 
 
 
 
Chen LM, Hatfield ML, Fu YY, Chai KX. Prostasin regulates iNOS and cyclin D1 expression by modulating protease-activated receptor-2 signaling in prostate epithelial cells. Prostate. 2009 Dec 1;69(16):1790-801. doi: 10.1002/pros.21030. PMID: 19670249.

External links